Pseudidonauton admirabile is a species of moth of the family Limacodidae. It is found on Peninsular Malaysia.

References 

Limacodidae
Moths of Malaysia
Moths described in 1931
Taxa named by Erich Martin Hering